Bhutan and Israel established formal relations in December 2020 with the signing of an agreement between the respective countries' ambassadors in India. Israel is the 54th country with which Bhutan has established ties. According to reports, the two countries have had a strong unofficial relationship since 1982, and have been in secret negotiations for several years before the formal announcement.

See also
 Foreign relations of Bhutan
 Foreign relations of Israel

References

 
Israel
Bilateral relations of Israel